Bjarne Thoelke (born 11 April 1992) is a German professional footballer who plays as a centre back for 1. FC Saarbrücken.

Club career
On 18 June 2012, it was announced that Thoelke went on a two-year loan deal to Dynamo Dresden until June 2014.

On 2 June 2015, Karlsruher SC announced their signing of Thoelke on a two-year contract. In June 2017, after his contract with Karlsruhe had expired, he signed for Bundesliga side Hamburger SV for a year.

In January 2021, after trialling with 1. FC Saarbrücken, Thoelke joined the 3. Liga club. He left the club as a free agent at the end of the 2020–21 season.

On 28 January 2022, 1. FC Saarbrücken signed Thoelke once again.

Career statistics

References

External links 
 

1992 births
Living people
People from Gifhorn
German footballers
Germany youth international footballers
Association football defenders
Bundesliga players
2. Bundesliga players
3. Liga players
Austrian Football Bundesliga players
VfL Wolfsburg players
VfL Wolfsburg II players
Dynamo Dresden players
Karlsruher SC players
Hamburger SV players
FC Admira Wacker Mödling players
1. FC Saarbrücken players
Footballers from Lower Saxony
German expatriate footballers
German expatriate sportspeople in Austria
Expatriate footballers in Austria